Salvia greatae is a species of flowering plant in the mint family, Lamiaceae. Its common names include Orocopia sage and lavender sage.

Distribution
The plant is endemic to California, where it is found in the mountainous Colorado Desert of southern Riverside and northern Imperial Counties, mainly in the Orocopia and Chocolate Mountains.

This plant grows in Sonoran Desert ecoregion habitats, on floodplains and along the edges of washes. It is scattered in distribution but it can be a dominant species in patches of appropriate habitat.

Description
The non-deciduous, hairy leaves are up to 2 centimeters long, the edges lined with several long, sharp-pointed teeth tipped with spines.

Flowers are borne in interrupted clusters along the stem branches. Each flower has a double-lipped tubular corolla about a centimeter long in a shade of pinkish purple. The corolla is surrounded by spiny sepals. It is aromatic.

References

External links
 Calflora database: Salvia greatae (Orocopia sage, lavender sage)
Salvia greatae. USDA PLANTS.
Salvia greatae — UC Photo gallery

greatae
Endemic flora of California
Flora of the California desert regions
Flora of the Sonoran Deserts
Natural history of the Colorado Desert
Natural history of Imperial County, California
Flora of Riverside County, California
Critically endangered flora of California